"The Big Sleep" is a 1950 American TV play based on the novel by Raymond Chandler. It was an episode of the anthology series Robert Montgomery Presents. Montgomery had played Philip Marlowe previously in Lady in the Lake. Many episodes of the series were adaptations of Hollywood films.

The broadcast was Zachary Scott's first appearance on TV.

Premise
Private detective Philip Marlowe is hired by General Sternwood to keep an eye on troubled daughter.

Cast
Zachary Scott as Philip Marlowe 
Patricia Gaye as Carmen
Jan Miner as Vivian
Herbert Rudley as Eddie Mars
Sonia Darrin as Agnes

References

External links

1950 in American television
Works based on American novels